Rosalind Cornett (née Rowe)  (14 April 193315 June 2015) was a British table tennis player who multiple competitions at the World Table Tennis Championships between 1951 and 1955.

Table tennis career
Rowe, and her twin sister Diane, were selected to play table tennis for England at age sixteen and toured Czechoslovakia. From 1951 to 1955 she won 14 medals in single, double, and team events in the World Table Tennis Championships, many of them together with her twin sister The pair were coached by Victor Barna.

The 14 World Championship medals included two gold medals in the doubles at the 1951 World Table Tennis Championships and 1954 World Table Tennis Championships.

Biography
Rowe was born in Queen Charlotte’s Hospital, Hammersmith, London on 14 April 1933, the older twin sisters by 10 minutes. Her father, Ronald George Rowe was an account clerk and her mother was Edith, née Delany. Both her father, and uncle Vivian Rowe, played football for Brentford F.C. and Wimbledon F.C. Both she and her sister worked as secretarial administrators professionally, using their free time for table tennis, writing and public appearances. In 1955 she and her sister Diane published a book, The twins on table tennis.

Rown took on a role at Dunlop company, to promote their products, such as table-tennis bats. Rowe married John Arthur Cornett, a doctor, on 8 October 1955 and they had four children together. Upon her marriage, she retired from competitive table tennis. She lived in Sittingbourne, Kent until her death on 15 June 2015 at Medway Maritime Hospital in Gillingham.

See also
 List of table tennis players
 List of World Table Tennis Championships medalists
 List of England players at the World Team Table Tennis Championships

References

English female table tennis players
1933 births
2015 deaths
People from Marylebone